The Israelites of the New Universal Pact are a South American religious sect, mostly concentrated in Peru. The evangelical Christian sect was founded in the Junin province of Peru in 1960 by Ezequiel Ataucusi Gamonal, following a break with the Seventh Day Adventist Church of which he and his followers had been members. The end-times sect, which postulates Peru as a promised land, and its founder as the Messiah, has gained a large following among indigenous people of the Peruvian jungle.

References

Evangelical organizations established in the 20th century
1960 establishments in South America